Jack Purdue (born 20 November 1999) is a Scottish professional footballer who plays as an attacking midfielder.

Career

Greenock Morton
Purdue joined Greenock Morton's Youth Academy from Gourock YAC in November 2014, and he made his development team breakthrough in September 2015. He signed a full-time contract in May 2016 to tie him to Morton until summer 2018. He made his professional debut as substitute on 24 February 2018 away to Inverness Caledonian Thistle F.C. in a 2-0 Morton win. In May 2018, Purdue signed on for a further season at Morton after scoring the winning penalty to secure the Development League West title for 2017-18. He was released by Morton in May 2019.

Queen's Park
Purdue signed for Queen's Park in July 2019. He made his debut for Queen's in a 0-0 draw v Hamilton Academical on 13 July 2019 in the League Cup.

Purdue scored his first senior goal in a 2-2 draw with Airdrieonians on 24 July 2019 in the League Cup. In a season of firsts Purdue also scored his first league goal, in a 2-1 win v Edinburgh City on 30 November 2019 in Scottish League Two. He signed for East Stirlingshire on loan on 21 February 2020 until the end of the season, which was curtailed by the covid-19 pandemic.

Annan Athletic
Annan Athletic announced the signing of Purdue on 3 October 2020. On 25 January 2022, Purdue was released from his contract.

Career statistics

Honours
Morton
SPFL Development League West: (2) 2015–16, 2017-18.

References

External links

1999 births
Association football midfielders
Association football forwards
Greenock Morton F.C. players
Queen's Park F.C. players
Living people
Scottish footballers
Scottish Professional Football League players
Footballers from Greenock
East Stirlingshire F.C. players
Annan Athletic F.C. players